David D'Errico (born June 3, 1952, in Newark, New Jersey) is a retired United States Men's National Team Captain and American soccer player. He spent eight years in the North American Soccer League (NASL), five in Major Indoor Soccer League (MISL) and one in the United Soccer League (USL). He won three MISL championships with the NY Arrows and earned twenty-one caps with the United States national team between 1974 and 1977.

Youth and college
David D’Errico grew up playing soccer in Harrison, New Jersey with his three older brothers (Michael, Anthony and Thomas). Throughout his youth, he played for the local Kearny Scots.                                 David was voted The MVP of the State of New Jersey and graduated from New Jersey’s Harrison High School in 1969. In 1999, he was named by The Star-Ledger as one of the top ten New Jersey high school soccer players of the 1940s–1960s.

In 1970–72, David was an All-American at Mitchell College and earned an AA. in 1972, he entered Hartwick College where he played on the men's soccer team for the 1972 and 1973 seasons. He was a First-Team All-American in 1973, the year that Hartwick went to the NCAA tournament quarterfinals before losing to Brown University in double overtime. David D'Errico graduated from Hartwick in 1974 with a bachelor's degree in history having played twenty-seven games, scored six goals and assisted on six others.

NASL

In 1974, the expansion Seattle Sounders selected David, "The Original Seattle Sounder" as their first overall pick in the NASL College Draft. In the 1974–1975 NASL offseason, the Sounders loaned David to League of Ireland First Division club, Dundalk. After spending three seasons in Seattle, David broke his fibula in 2 places and tore ligaments during practice. David fully recovered.

David played with Sounder’s greats, (Sir) Geoff Hurst, (World Cup Winner and scored a "Hat Trick" vs. Germany in the 1966 World Cup Final), Harry Redknapp, (West Ham United, teammates with Geoff Hurst and future Sounder and England World Cup Winning Captain (Sir) Bobby Moore), assistant coach for The Sounders and future manager of Tottenham Hotspur. Another beloved Sounders player was former Everton and Chelsea hard man and Sounder's assistant coach Jimmy Gabriel.

He also had the great honor to play against some of the greatest American soccer players, (Bobby Smith, Al Trost, Shep Messing, Santiago Formoso, Jimmy McAlister, Julie Veee), International players and "Marked" some of the greatest players in World Soccer, Pele, (Winner of 3 World Cup Medals for Brazil, scored over 1,200 goals and Voted The Player of the Century),  Johan Cruyff, The Dutch Master, Franz Beckenbauer, (World Cup Winner as a player and coach), the brilliant George Best, World Cup winners, Carlos Alberto and Gerd Müller, World Class Johan Neeskens, Teofilo, (Nene), Cubillas, Vladislav (Bogie) Bogicevic, Giorgio Chinaglia, Dennis Tueart,

At the time, he and Mike England were competing for the starting position. After a contract dispute David asked to be traded to the Minnesota Kicks. He spent only a single season in Minnesota before moving to the New England Tea Men for the 1978 season. In 1978, he was named as an NASL Honorable Mention All-Star.

MISL and NASL
At the end of the 1978 season, David began alternating between the outdoor NASL and the indoor Major Indoor Soccer League (MISL). In 1978, he joined the Cincinnati Kids for its one season in the newly established MISL. The Kids played the first MISL game, against the New York Arrows. That year the Kids made the playoffs only to lose to the Arrows in the semifinals.

In 1979, David played for the Rochester Lancers of the NASL. Once again he played only a single season with the Lancers, but his time with the team was significant in that the Lancers also entered the MISL as the New York Arrows. D'Errico was second-team All-Star for the 1979–1980 MISL season and a first-team All-Star for the 1980–1981 MISL season.

The NY Arrows won 4 MISL Championships. David, his NY Arrows teammates, some of the best indoor players of all time, Steve Zungal,(The Lord of All Indoors), Branko, (The Laser), Segota, Shep Messing, Zoltán Tóth, Luis Alberto, Fred Grgurev, Doc Lawson, won 3 of 4 of the first Major Indoor Soccer League Championships.

David was the 1st player to score a short-handed goal with 2 men down in an MISL NY Arrows game and was the first player to have his number retired by the 4 Time MISL Champions.

David played one more season in the NASL, this time with the San Diego Sockers in 1980. The Sockers were a team, much like the Lancers/Arrows, a solid outdoors team, but came to dominate the indoor league.

USL
In 1984, David played for the Charlotte Gold. The Gold were a part of the short-lived outdoor United Soccer League which lasted only the 1984 and part of the 1985 season. David was the player-coach and led the team to an 11–13 record. The Gold folded at the end of the season.

National team

The National Team went on tour to play South American teams, Universitaria of Ecuador, Millonarios of Colombia, and Alianza of Peru.

In 1978, the return leg, The National Team was coached by the American and Philadelphia native Walt Chyzowych at The Festival of the Americas, a round-robin tournament was held at Downing Stadium at Randall's Island, New York, pitting the US National team against Universitaria of Ecuador, Millonarios of Colombia, and Alianza of Peru.

The Americans included David D'Errico, Bobby Smith, Al Trost, Arnie Mausser, Boris Bandov, Greg Villa, Gary Etherington, Tony Donlic and Ricky Davis.

The US team shut out Universitaria 3–0 and Millonarios 3–0, and beat Alianza 2–1 to win the tournament. The US outscored their opponents 8–1. Although their skills were rudimentary, the Americans showed a promising practicality, and particularly among the aggressive forwards, traditionally a weak spot, given the NASL's lack of opportunity for US strikers. Americans were generally relegated to defense and goalkeeping.

The US then went on to play five games in Central America, losing two to Guatemala, being shut out by Mexico 3–0 and splitting a pair with El Salvador.

The US team finished with a three-game series against China, David D'Errico, Captained The USMNT against China, a tie, 1–1 in Washington, winning 2–1 in San Francisco and 1–0 in Atlanta.

David D'Errico also made his debut for the U.S. national team in 1974, playing the team's only two games of that year, both losses to Mexico. In 1975, he played two of the team's five games, one as a sub. However, in 1976, he became an integral member of the team and its eventual Captain as it began qualifications for the 1978 FIFA World Cup. He continued to play through the end of 1977 and experienced the disappointment of failing to qualify for the World Cup finals in 1978 in Argentina.

David has a graduate degree from Seattle Pacific University in sports psychology and sociology.

In 1995, Hartwick College inducted David D'Errico into its Athletic Hall of Fame.

Personal life
David D'Errico has two sons, Aaron and Adam D’Errico.

Movies
David D'Errico starred as himself in the 2021 NASL professional soccer documentary, Big-Time Soccer: The Remarkable Rise & Fall of the NASL.

References

External links
1975 Sounders profile
1976 Sounders bio
2007 interview
NASL/MISL stats
Imdb.com profile

1952 births
Living people
People from Harrison, New Jersey
Soccer players from Newark, New Jersey
American soccer players
American soccer coaches
Seattle Pacific University alumni
American expatriate soccer players
Charlotte Gold players
Cincinnati Kids players
Dundalk F.C. players
League of Ireland players
Hartwick Hawks men's soccer players
Major Indoor Soccer League (1978–1992) players
Minnesota Kicks players
North American Soccer League (1968–1984) players
North American Soccer League (1968–1984) indoor players
New England Tea Men players
New York Arrows players
Rochester Lancers (1967–1980) players
San Diego Sockers (NASL) players
Seattle Sounders (1974–1983) players
United Soccer League (1984–85) coaches
United Soccer League (1984–85) players
United States men's international soccer players
Sportspeople from Hudson County, New Jersey
All-American men's college soccer players
Association football defenders
Expatriate association footballers in the Republic of Ireland
American expatriate sportspeople in Ireland